Seymouriamorpha were a small but widespread group of limbed vertebrates (tetrapods). They have long been considered reptiliomorphs, and most paleontologists may still accept this point of view, but some analyses suggest that seymouriamorphs are stem-tetrapods (not more closely related to Amniota than to Lissamphibia). Many seymouriamorphs were terrestrial or semi-aquatic. However, aquatic larvae bearing external gills and grooves from the lateral line system have been found, making them unquestionably amphibians. The adults were terrestrial. They ranged from lizard-sized creatures (30 centimeters) to crocodile-sized 150 centimeter long animals. They were reptile-like. If seymouriamorphs are reptiliomorphs, they were the distant relatives of amniotes. Seymouriamorphs form into three main groups, Kotlassiidae, Discosauriscidae, and Seymouriidae, a group that includes the best known genus, Seymouria. The last seymouriamorph became extinct by the end of the Permian.

Taxonomy

Reptiliomorpha
Order Seymouriamorpha
Biarmica
Enosuchus
Kotlassia 
Leptoropha
Microphon
Nyctiboetus
Utegenia
Waggoneria
Family Karpinskiosauridae
Karpinskiosaurus
Family Discosauriscidae
Ariekanerpeton
Discosauriscus
Makowskia
Spinarerpeton
Family Seymouriidae
Seymouria

Cladogram based on Ruta, Jeffery, & Coates (2003):

Cladogram based on Klembara (2009) & Klembara (2010):

Gallery

References

External links
 Bystrow, A.P. Kotlassia prima Amalitzky. Bulletin of the Geological Society of America, Washington, 1944, v.55, N5, pp.379-416.
 Seymouriamorpha - at Paleos
 Seymouriamorpha at Tree of Life Web Project

Seymouriamorphs
Cisuralian first appearances
Lopingian extinctions